Matranga is a surname. Notable people with the surname include:

Dave Matranga (born 1977), American Major League Baseball player for the Florida Marlins organization
David Matranga, American voice actor who works for ADV Films and Seraphim Digital
Jonah Matranga (born 1969), singer, songwriter, and guitarist